Sturba may refer to:

Sturba (Livanjsko Polje), a river of Bosnia and Herzegovina

People with the surname
Alessandro Sturba (born 1972), Italian footballer